A Vice-President of the European Commission is a member of the European Commission who leads the commission's work in particular focus areas in which multiple European Commissioners participate. Currently, the European Commission has a total of eight vice-presidents.

Role and benefits

The role of vice-president of the European Commission may be bestowed on any European Commissioner in addition to their existing portfolio.

Since the 2009 Lisbon Treaty entered into force, the High Representative of the Union for Foreign Affairs and Security Policy is ex officio one of the vice-presidents. The other vice-presidents are appointed at the discretion of the Commission President.

Commission salaries are set as a percentage of the top civil service grade. Vice-Presidents are paid at 125% (€22,122.10 monthly), in comparison to 112.5% (€19,909.89) for normal Commissioners and 138% (€24,422.80) for the President. However, the vice-president who also serves as the High Representative is paid at 130% (€23,006.98). There are further allowances on top of these figures.

First Vice-President
The First Vice-President usually takes on the main role of a vice president: taking over from the President in their absence. Frans Timmermans is the incumbent First Vice-President having served in the position since 2014 in both the Juncker and von der Leyen Commissions.

The position was established under the Barroso I Commission in 2004, with its first occupant being Margot Wallström. She was succeeded in the second Barroso Commission by Catherine Ashton who was also the High Representative of the Union for Foreign Affairs and Security Policy.

Executive Vice-President
The von der Leyen Commission established a new position of Executive Vice-President. There are three Executive Vice-Presidents, one of whom is the First Vice-President, who in addition to their other roles also manage a policy area, with a specific Directorate-General under their authority for this part of their job.

Historical vice-presidents

Legend:    –  – 

 First Vice-Presidents are in italics.
Executive Vice-Presidents are in bold.

References

External links
 European Commission Website ec.europa.eu